KVEL (920 AM) is an News/Talk formatted radio station. Licensed to Vernal, Utah, United States, the station is currently owned by Ashley Communications, Inc.

Programs on the station include Coast to Coast AM, segments from ESPN Radio and games of the Utah Jazz. In addition to carrying ESPN, KVEL carries segments from Fox Sports Radio.

KVEL was originally on 1340 kHz and moved to 1250 kHz in 1957. It moved to 920 kHz in 1971.

References

External links

VEL
Oldies radio stations in the United States
News and talk radio stations in the United States